The 2011 Faysal Bank Super Eight T20 Cup was the first season of the Faysal Bank Super Eight T20 Cup. The tournament was held from 24 June in Faisalabad, between the top eight teams from the 2010–11 Faysal Bank T20 Cup. The winners were awarded ₨2.5 million in prize money while the runners-up received ₨1 million. The Rawalpindi Rams won the tournament by defeating the Karachi Dolphins in the final in the Super Over.

Results

Teams and standings 

 Qualified for semifinals
Points table on ESPNcricinfo

Knockout stage

Venue 
All of the matches in the tournament were played at Iqbal Stadium, Faisalabad. Its capacity is 25,000.

Squads 

Misbah-ul-Haq (c)
Abdul Rauf
Ali Waqas
Asif Ali
Asif Hussain (wk)
Faisal Yasin
Hasan Mahmood
Khurram Shehzad
Mohammad Hafeez
Mohammad Shahid
Mohammad Talha
Mustansar Hussain
Naved Latif
Zahoor Khan
Zulqarnain

Azeem Ghumman (c)
Aqeel Anjum
Ayaz Jamali
Faisal Athar (wk)
Farhan Ayub
Ghulam Yasin
Jamshed Baig
Mir Ali
Nasir Awais
Nauman Ali
Shahid Qambrani
Sharjeel Khan
Suleman Baloch
Zahid Mahmood

Iftikhar Anjum (c)
Afaq Raheem
Ameer Khan
Imad Wasim
Naeem Anjum (wk)
Nasrullah Khan
Nauman Masood
Qaiser Rehman
Raheel Majeed
Saad Altaf
Shan Masood
Umair Khan
Umar Gul
Zeeshan Mushtaq
Zohaib Ahmed

Mohammad Sami (c)
Asad Shafiq
Azam Hussain
Fawad Alam
Haaris Ayaz
Khalid Latif
Misbah Khan
Rameez Aziz
Rameez Raja Jr.
Sarfraz Ahmed (wk)
Shahzaib Hasan
Sohail Khan
Tanvir Ahmed
Tariq Haroon

Mohammad Yousuf (c)
Abid Ali
Ahmed Dar
Ahmed Shehzad
Aizaz Cheema
Emmad Ali
Kamran Akmal (wk)
Mohammad Waheed
Nasir Jamshed
Saad Nasim
Shabbir Ahmed
Umar Akmal
Usman Salahuddin
Waqas Aslam

Abdur Rauf (c)
Ahmed Raza
Ali Moazzam
Ansar Javed
Gulraiz Sadaf (wk)
Mohammad Irfan
Mohammad Zahid
Naved Yasin
Rameez Alam
Taimur Ahmed
Yasir Arafat
Zain Abbas
Zeeshan Ashraf
Zulfiqar Babar

Sohail Tanvir (c)
Adnan Mufti
Awais Zia
Hammad Azam
Jamal Anwar (wk)
Mohammad Ayaz
Mohammad Nawaz
Mohammad Rameez
Muzammil Nizam
Naved Malik
Raza Hasan
Rizwan Akbar
Sadaf Hussain
Samiullah
Tayyab Riaz
Umar Amin
Usman Saeed
Zahid Mansoor

Shoaib Malik (c)
Abdur Rehman
Adeel Malik
Ali Khan
Faisal Naved
Farhan Malik
Haris Sohail
Imran Nazir
Mansoor Amjad
Mohammad Ali
Muntazir Mehdi
Naved-ul-Hasan
Prince Abbas
Qaiser Abbas
Sarfraz Ahmed
Sarmad Anwar
Shahid Yousuf
Shakeel Ansar (wk)
Umaid Asif

Fixtures 
All match times in Pakistan Standard Time (UTC+5:30).

Group stage

Group A

Group B

Knockout stage 
Semi-finals

Final

Statistics

Most runs 
The top five highest run scorers (total runs) in the season are included in this table.

Full Table on Cricinfo

Highest scores 
This table contains the top five highest scores of the season made by a batsman in a single innings.

 Full Table on Cricinfo

Most wickets 
The following table contains the five leading wicket-takers of the season.

Full Table on Cricinfo

Best bowling figures 
This table lists the top five players with the best bowling figures in the season.

Full Table on Cricinfo

Player awards 
The following table lists awards which were handed out to players who performed well throughout the tournament

References

External links 
Faysal Bank Super 8 T20 2011 – Geo Super
Faysal Bank Super 8 T20 2011 – ESPNcricinfo

2011 in Pakistani cricket
Domestic cricket competitions in 2010–11
2011 Super 8 Twenty20 Cup
Pakistani cricket seasons from 2000–01